The 1993–94 season was the 59th season in existence for Real Zaragoza competed in La Liga for 16th consecutive year and Copa del Rey.

Summary
The club had one of the best seasons since the 1960s, the team won its 4th Copa del Rey ever after defeated Celta de Vigo in the 1994 Copa del Rey Final and finished on 3rd spot on La Liga only behind Champion FC Barcelona and Deportivo La Coruña. During summer, the squad was reinforced with Forward Juan Eduardo Esnaider y Juanmi from Real Madrid and after transferred out Andreas Brehme arrived to the team Defender Fernando Cáceres from CA River Plate, those three arrivals on loan.

After started the League with five winless matches and the fans asking for his sacking, manager Victor Fernandez changed the squad to a more offensive tactic with three forwards Pardeza, Esnaider and Higuera. Those tactic changes worked out, including a 6-2 score against Tenerife, a massive 6-3 win against Barcelona and a shocking 4-0 win against Atletico Madrid at Vicente Calderon stadium. On the last match the squad defeated Real Madrid by 4-1, clinching the third spot for the first time since 1973. Another record for the team was 71 league goals scored.

Squad

Transfers

Winter

Competitions

La Liga

League table

Position by round

Matches

Copa del Rey

Eightfinals

Quarterfinals

Semifinals

Final

Statistics

Players statistics

See also
  BDFutbol

References

Real Zaragoza
Real Zaragoza seasons